Enzo Sanga (born 19 May 1995) is a French rugby union footballer. He plays as a scrum-half.

Born in Vichy, Enzo Sanga currently plays for Montpellier Herault RC in the Top 14.

References

External links
ESPN Profile
itsrugby.co.uk Profile

1995 births
Living people
French rugby union players
Montpellier Hérault Rugby players
Rugby union scrum-halves
People from Vichy
Sportspeople from Allier